The Monette Water Tower is a historic elevated steel water tower located in Hartford, Arkansas. It was built in 1936 by the Chicago Bridge & Iron Company in conjunction with the Public Works Administration as part of a project to improve the local water supply. The project was one of 124 similar projects in the state funded by the PWA. It was added to the National Register of Historic Places in 2008, as part of a multiple-property listing that included numerous other New Deal-era projects throughout Arkansas.

See also
Cotter Water Tower
Hampton Waterworks
Mineral Springs Waterworks
Monette Water Tower
National Register of Historic Places listings in Sebastian County, Arkansas
Waldo Water Tower (Waldo, Arkansas)

References

External links
An Ambition to be Preferred: New Deal Recovery Efforts and Architecture in Arkansas, 1933-1943, By Holly Hope

Water towers on the National Register of Historic Places in Arkansas
Towers completed in 1936
Infrastructure completed in 1936
Buildings and structures in Sebastian County, Arkansas
National Register of Historic Places in Sebastian County, Arkansas